Tinaquillo is a city in Cojedes, Venezuela, 53 km from San Carlos. It is the seat of the Falcón Municipality, Cojedes. It has a total population of 97,687 (2011).

Economy
Agriculture and cattle breeding have traditionally been main sectors in the region's economy.

Notable people
 
 
Auri López (born 1999), Venezuelan model, imageologist and beauty pageant titleholder

References

Cities in Cojedes (state)
Populated places established in 1781